Abhimani is a 2009 Indian Kannada-language film directed by Praveen Engineer starring Rahul Salanke and Nidhi Subbaiah in the lead roles.

Cast

 Rahul Salanke as Muthu
 Nidhi Subbaiah as Arpana
 Sarath Babu as Ananthu
 Tara as Lakshmi
 Srinath
 Chithra Shenoy
 Rangayana Raghu
 Kunigal Nagabhushan
 Manjunath

Music

Reception

Critical response 

R G Vijayasarathy of Rediff.com scored the film at 1.5 out of 5 stars and says "Rahul who starred in Nannusire needs to improve his expressions and dialogue delivery. Veteran actor Sharath Kumar overacts in a few sequences while Srinath, Tara and Chitra Shenoy are okay. All in all, Abhimaani is just an average fare". A critic from The New Indian Express wrote "Meanwhile, Muthu is diagnosed with cancer. The story then revolves around how he gets cured from the deadly disease and how he realises his mother’s dream. It is worth watching by whole family members". BS Srivani from Deccan Herald wrote "Tara is presented beautifully, so is model-turned-actress Nidhi. But for the comedy track and angry editing, ‘Abhimani’ would have been a better film". A critic from Bangalore Mirror wrote  "But the real problem is with unnecessary comedy scenes that neither tickles you nor helps the story. There is also the unnecessary entry of goons to add a fight sequence to the narrative. If 30 minutes of these are removed, Abhimani is good enough for any film fan". A critic from The Times of India scored the film at 2 out of 5 stars wrote "Rahul could improve a bit. Srinath, Chithra Shenoy and Sharath Babu excel. Music by Dharmateja is okay. Less said the better about Nidhi".

References

2000s Kannada-language films
2009 films